Robyn Curnow (born 1972) is a South African journalist and news anchor. She previously anchored CNN Newsroom at 6 pm and 7 am on Friday. During the coronavirus pandemic, she also anchored the program at 2 am. The program was a fast-moving news show that showcased CNN’s global reach by going live to CNN's reporters around the world, tracking the day-by-day developments and global news for CNN's international viewers.

After more than 20 years as a correspondent and anchor at CNN International, on 3 May 2022, Curnow announced she would be leaving CNN.

Early life

Curnow graduated with a master's degree in International Relations from Cambridge University. She was born in Australia and raised in South Africa and is the granddaughter of South African cricketer Syd Curnow.

She was diagnosed with dyslexia.

Career

Before joining CNN, Curnow was a reporter for the BBC and for the South African Broadcasting Corporation in the Mandela era.

Curnow started reporting for CNN in 2001 in London, covering the UK and Europe. She is currently based in Atlanta, at CNN's World headquarters. She was previously CNN's correspondent in Africa, based in Johannesburg, where she reported on a variety of stories including the HIV/AIDS epidemic, the football World Cup, political scandals involving South African President Jacob Zuma and Boko Haram. She traveled extensively on the continent and reported from Zimbabwe on human rights abuses and corruption.

While based in South Africa, Curnow led CNN's coverage of Nelson Mandela's ill health, death and reported live from his funeral. Curnow had a long association with Mandela, interviewing him a number of times during and after his presidency. Her conversation with him on his 90th birthday was the last interview he gave.

Curnow also covered Oscar Pistorius before and after he was convicted of murdering his girlfriend, Reeva Steenkamp. Her reports featured exclusive footage and interviews with Pistorius and his inner circle.

When coalition forces launched the Mosul offensive in Iraq in October 2016, Curnow anchored the coverage, which contributed to a News and Documentary Emmy nomination for CNN. She also anchored CNN's coverage of the fall of Zimbabwe's longtime leader Robert Mugabe and anchored hours of rolling news with correspondents in Harare and around the region for which CNN won the Royal Television Society Award for Best Breaking News coverage.

Curnow was in Havana for two key events: U.S. President Barack Obama's historic trip to Cuba in 2016 and then the death of Fidel Castro.

She interviewed former U.S. President George W. Bush and his wife, Laura, when they visited Zambia on a charity trip after his presidency. During the interview President Bush called Edward Snowden a traitor.

Separately, Curnow has interviewed former U.S. President Bill Clinton. She had an extensive sit-down interview with former First Lady Michelle Obama during her visit to Africa. She also interviewed Oprah Winfrey at her girls’ school outside Johannesburg and spent time with Archbishop Desmond Tutu, reporting on his criticisms of the ruling ANC party in South Africa.

Curnow has written for Vogue magazine, Marie Clare magazine and The International Herald Tribune. She is an advocate for people who stutter, and has written about her family's struggles with the speech impediment for the Washington Post.

References

External links 
 
 Robyn Curnow's profile on CNN.com
https://www.cnn.com/2018/11/02/politics/us-midterms-migration-foreign-policy-analysis-intl/index.html
 https://www.washingtonpost.com/outlook/2018/09/10/candidate-governor-maryland-stutters-so-does-my-young-daughter/
 https://www.cnn.com/travel/article/robyn-curnow-wwii-pow-changi-singapore/index.html
 https://www.cnn.com/2018/07/18/opinions/what-would-mandela-do-in-age-of-trump-opinion-intl/index.html
 https://www.standard.co.uk/news/world/black-woman-lawyer-versus-rifletoting-cowboyboot-man-showdown-in-georgia-a3966141.html
 https://en.globes.co.il/en/article-disruption-awaits-in-2018-1001218976
 https://rts.org.uk/article/winners-rts-television-journalism-awards-2019-announced

Living people
Alumni of the University of Cambridge
CNN people
South African people of English descent
South African journalists
White South African people
1972 births
Television presenters with dyslexia